Susquehannock, also known as Conestoga, is an Iroquoian language spoken by the Native American people variously known as the Susquehannock or Conestoga.

Information about Susquehannock is scant. Almost all known words and phrases come from the Vocabula Mahakuassica, a vocabulary written by the Swedish missionary Johannes Campanius in New Sweden during the 1640s and published by his grandson Thomas Campanius Holm in two separate works in 1696 and 1702. Peter Stephen Du Ponceau translated the 1702 work from Swedish to English in 1834.

Campanius's vocabulary contains just over 100 words and phrases. Linguist Marianne Mithun believes this limited data is sufficient to classify Susquehannock as a Northern Iroquoian language, closely related to the languages of the Haudenosaunee Confederacy. Examples of Susquehannock-language place names include Conestoga, Juniata, and Swatara.

Place names in the Conestoga homeland are documented as of Conestoga origin. After 1763, some Conestoga remnant peoples joined nations of the Haudenosaunee Confederacy, and the Conestoga language survived for a time. Indian Villages and Place Names in Pennsylvania with Numerous Historical Notes and References (1928), a book by Dr. George P. Donehoo identifies place names derived from the Conestoga language.

Notes

References

 Holm, Thomas Campanius, et al. A Vocabulary of Susquehannock. 2nd ed., translated by Peter Stephen Duponceau, Evolution Publishing, 2007. American Language Reprints, edited by Claudio R. Salvucci. .

 2021. Conestoga Language Living Dictionary. https://livingdictionaries.app/conestoga_language
 Mithun, Marianne. “Stalking the Susquehannocks.” International Journal of American Linguistics, vol. 47, no. 1, Jan. 1981, pp. 1-26. JSTOR, https://www.jstor.org/stable/1264630.
 Donehoo, George P. Indian Villages and Place Names in Pennsylvania: with Numerous Historical Notes and References. Sunbury Press, 2014. .

External links
 Native-languages.org
 Conestoga Language Living Dictionary, hosted on the Living Dictionaries platform: 

Northern Iroquoian languages
Indigenous languages of the North American eastern woodlands
Extinct languages of North America
First Nations languages in Canada
Native American history of Maryland
Native American history of Pennsylvania
 
Languages extinct in the 18th century
Indigenous languages of Pennsylvania
Indigenous languages of Maryland